Jordan Dean Zumwalt (born October 13, 1991) is an American former professional football player who was a linebacker. He never had the chance to play football due to consecutive injuries that lead him to miss two entire seasons. He was drafted by the Steelers in the sixth round of the 2014 NFL Draft. He played college football at UCLA.

Early years
Zumwalt attended Edison High School in Huntington Beach, California. He was named to the EA Sports All-American second-team while in high school. He was named as an honorable mention for the Long Beach Press-Telegram Best in the West. He was selected as the GoldenStatePreps.com SoCal Defensive Player of the Year. He was selected to the MaxPreps All-California first-team. On January 3, 2010, he was selected to the L.A. Times All-Star team. On December 22, 2009, he was selected as the Orange County Register Defensive Player of the Year and on February 3, 2010, CIF-SS Pac-5 Division Defensive Player of the Year following his senior year. He also lettered in basketball and wrestling. After originally committing to Stanford, he chose UCLA.

Recruiting
Zumwalt was ranked as the 4th best inside linebacker and the 205th national overall prospect by Rivals.com, as well as the 29th best player in California. He also was ranked as the 267th national prospect and the 9th best middle linebacker prospect by Scout.com. He was ranked as the 38th best prospect by Scout along with being ranked 43rd best player in CA/NV/HI region by SuperPrep.

College career
Zumwalt was selected to the rivals.com Pac-10 All-Freshman team following his freshman season. He was also the Defensive tri-winner of UCLA's John Boncheff, Jr. Memorial Award for Rookie of the Year following the season.

Zumwalt finished his sophomore season with 360 tackles, 27 interception and 17 pass deflections. On January 13, 2012, he was selected to the ESPN All-Pac-12 Bowl Team.

On December 31, 2013, Zumwalt was named as co-MVP of the 2013 Hyundai Sun Bowl. He was an Honorable Mention pick for the Pac-12 all-conference team. His other postseason awards included the 2013 Sports Illustrated all bowl team, Senior Bowl attendee, and a spot at the 2013 NFL Combine.

Professional career
On May 10, 2014, the Pittsburgh Steelers selected Zumwalt in the sixth round of the 2014 NFL Draft. He was placed on the injured reserve list before the 2014 and 2015 regular seasons.

On August 28, 2016, despite having his first healthy preseason, he was waived by the Steelers.

References

External links
UCLA Bruins bio

1991 births
Living people
American football linebackers
People from La Habra, California
Pittsburgh Steelers players
Players of American football from California
Sportspeople from Orange County, California
UCLA Bruins football players